Motor City Madness  is a compilation album by the American funk rock band Funkadelic, released in 2003 by Westbound Records. It features a selection of songs previously released on the band's original albums for Westbound from 1970 to 1976. The compilation's 29 tracks span the length of two discs. Music critic Robert Christgau has said that, "for those with the heart for it, this is their most listenable album."

Track listing

Disc one
"Free Your Mind and Your Ass Will Follow" (Clinton, Hazel, Davis) 10:04
from the album Free Your Mind... and Your Ass Will Follow
"Red Hot Mama" (Clinton) 3:24
from the album Standing on the Verge of Getting It On
"You Can't Miss What You Can't Measure" (Clinton, Barnes) 3:03
from the album Cosmic Slop
"Standing on the Verge of Getting It On" (Clinton, Hazel) 5:08
from the album Standing on the Verge of Getting It On
"Funky Dollar Bill" (Clinton, Hazel, Davis) 3:14
from the album Free Your Mind... and Your Ass Will Follow
"Hit It and Quit It" (Clinton, Nelson) 3:48
from the album Maggot Brain
"Cosmic Slop" (Clinton, Worrell) 5:17
from the album Cosmic Slop
"Better by the Pound" (Clinton, Hazel) 2:41
from the album Let's Take It to the Stage
"Take Your Dead Ass Home" (Clinton, Goins, Shider, Worrell) 7:16
from the album Tales of Kidd Funkadelic
"Loose Booty" (Clinton, Beane) 4:52
from the album America Eats Its Young
"Get Off Your Ass and Jam" (Clinton) 2:24
from the album Let's Take It to the Stage
"Sexy Ways" (Clinton, Hazel) 3:04
from the album Standing on the Verge of Getting It On
"Music for My Mother" (Clinton, Hazel, Nelson) 5:37
from the album Funkadelic
"America Eats Its Young" (Clinton, Worrell, Beane) 5:52
from the album America Eats Its Young
"March to the Witch's Castle" (Clinton) 6:01
from the album Cosmic Slop

Disc two
"Maggot Brain" (Hazel, Clinton) 10:18
 from the album Maggot Brain
"I'll Stay" (Clinton, Hazel) 7:17
 from the album Standing on the Verge of Getting It On
"I Wanna Know If It's Good to You" (Clinton, Haskins, Hazel, Nelson) 5:59
 from the album Free Your Mind... and Your Ass Will Follow
"Can You Get to That" (Clinton, Harris) 2:48
 from the album Maggot Brain
"I'll Bet You" (Clinton, Barnes, Lindsey) 3:55
 from the album Funkadelic
"Nappy Dugout" (Clinton, Shider, Mosson) 4:33
 from the album Cosmic Slop
"A Joyful Process" (Clinton, Worrell) 6:13
 from the album America Eats Its Young
"Be My Beach" (Clinton, Collins, Worrell) 2:36
 from the album Let's Take It to the Stage
"Undisco Kidd" (Clinton, Collins, Worrell) 6:34
 from the album Tales of Kidd Funkadelic
"Biological Speculation" (Clinton, Harris) 3:06
 from the album America Eats Its Young
"You and Your Folks, Me and My Folks" (Clinton, Worrell, Jones) 3:35
 from the album Maggot Brain
"I Got a Thing, You Got a Thing, Everybody's Got a Thing" (Haskins) 3:52
 from the album Funkadelic
"Baby I Owe You Something Good" (Clinton) 5:46
 from the album Let's Take It to the Stage
"Mommy, What's a Funkadelic?" (Clinton) 9:06
 from the album Funkadelic

References

External links
 

2006 compilation albums
Funkadelic albums
Westbound Records albums